"Charlotte Anne" is a song by English singer Julian Cope released as the first single from his album My Nation Underground in 1988. The song was Cope's only chart-topping single on any U.S. chart, reaching number one on the Modern Rock Tracks chart in the United States for one week in early 1989.

It was released on 7", CD, 12" and 12" picture disc formats.

Track listing

12" (12IS380), 12" picture disc (12ISP380) and CD (CIDP380) ISLAND IS380
 "Charlotte Anne" (Cope)
 "Books" (McCulloch/Cope)
 "A Question of Temperature" (Schung/Hanny/Appel)
 "Christmas Mourning" (Cope)

7" single IS380
 "Charlotte Anne"
 "Christmas Mourning"

Charts

See also
List of Billboard number-one alternative singles of the 1980s

References

1988 songs
1988 singles
Songs written by Julian Cope
Island Records singles
Song recordings produced by Ron Fair